Idotea linearis is a species of elongated isopod crustacean.

Description
Idotea linearis is a narrow organism, up to seven times longer than wide. Males tend to be larger than females, and can reach  in length.

Distribution and ecology
The distribution of Idotea linearis extends from the North Sea south to Morocco and the Mediterranean Sea. It lives below the littoral zone, and can often be seen swimming near sandy shores at low tide.

See also
Crustaceans portal
Arthropods portal

References

Valvifera
Crustaceans of the Atlantic Ocean
Crustaceans described in 1763
Taxa named by Carl Linnaeus